Haji Khan Larik was born in 1895, and the date of his death still remains unknown. He was born in Moulehdino Larik, a village in Naushahro Feroze, Sindh, Pakistan. He received his secondary education at Naushahro Madrasa 1909 and was awarded the "Principal's Medal". He joined the Sindh Madrasatul Islam, in Karachi in the year 1913 and passed the Matriculation and school final examination in 1914.

Larik joined F. Y. Arts at Bahauddin College, Junagadh in 1915 and passed the intermediate arts examination in 1917 with mathematics as his elective subject. In the intermediate class he won an essay prize open to a class of 80 students. He received his Bachelor of Arts, 2nd class with honors in English in 1919.

While living in Junagadh he was the President of the Sindh Muslim Association. Larik was directly taken as Mukhtiarkar (Tehsildar) in which capacity he served for three years. He joined the legal profession in 1923, focusing on civil and criminal practice in Mehar Taluka in the Larkana and Dadu districts. He was offered the title of 'Sir' by the British but refused.

He was a nominated member on the District Local Board in Dadu during 1937 to 1938. Do to the work Larik did the Dadu District's Local Board nominated him to a seat on the Sindh Madressah board. Larik was elected to be the vice-chairman of the Dadu District School Board due to his interest in Muslim education. He was also a member of the All-India Muslim League and was also a Freedom Fighter.

References

1895 births
Year of death missing
People from Sindh